Sublette  may refer to:

People
 Sublette (surname), a French-language surname

Places
 Sublette, Colorado
 Sublette Township, Lee County, Illinois
 Sublette, Illinois
 Sublette, Kansas
 Sublette, Missouri
 Sublette, New Mexico
 Sublette County, Wyoming
 Sublette Mountain, Lincoln County, Wyoming

See also
Sublett, Kentucky